Terry Walsh (5 May 1939 – 21 April 2002) was a British actor stuntman, stunt arranger and fight arranger who contributed much to British television and film, especially during the 1970s. He stunt-doubled for Michael Caine, Jon Pertwee, Tom Baker and David Warner amongst others.

Walsh is known for his work on the science fiction television programme Doctor Who. He worked on the show from 1966 to 1979. He is seen in this  as an Exxilon being shot by the Daleks, filmed in 1973.

He was also the stunt co-ordinator for Robin of Sherwood, devising three sword fighting sequences, which subsequently became standard movements on television and film. The moves were known as Robin Hood 1, 2 and 3.

His other credits include The Sandbaggers, Tales of the Unexpected, Z-Cars, Space: 1999, Dixon of Dock Green and Softly, Softly.

When he wasn't stunting, he drove a black-cab from Edgware station taxi-rank.

Filmography

Doctor Who

External links
 

British male television actors
1939 births
2002 deaths
English stunt performers